Mahmudabad-e Tabat Bayi (also Romanized as Maḥmūdābād-e Tabāṭ Bāyī) is a village in Valiabad Rural District, in the Central District of Qarchak County, Tehran Province, Iran. At the 2006 census, its population was 19, in 6 families.

References 

Populated places in Qarchak County